Blagge is a surname. Notable people with the surname include: 

George Blagge (1512–1551), English courtier, politician, soldier and poet
Thomas Blagge (1613–1660), Groom of the Chamber to Charles I and Charles II

See also
Bagge